Lecidea atrobrunnea is a crustose lichen in the Lecideaceae family, found in mountains of the continental western United States and Alaska. With other lichen communities, it forms dark vertical drip-like stripings along drainage tracks in the rock faces, resulting in Native Americans giving the name "Face of a Young Woman Stained with Tears" to Half Dome. This combined lichen community appears black from a distance, but brown up close.

It varies greatly in its overall appearance from colony to colony. L atrobrunnea subsp. atrobrunnea has been found to be common in very common in high montane zones and alpine zones. L atrobrunnea subsp. saxosa ("saxosa" meaning "rock") has been found in high elevations in the San Francisco Peaks and San Bernardino Mountains. The prothallus and apothecia are black, while the thallus areoles are brown.  The upper surface is usually pale to dark reddish brown in the center of areoles. In squamulous specimens, the lower surface can be seen, and is shiny and dark. The scientific name atrobrunnea is a combination of two Latin words: Ater from "atro", meaning "black" and "brunnea" from brunneus meaning "dark brown". The combination of the two means "blackish-brown".

It is commonly found on rock faces in the Sierra Nevada. The communities often completely cover the exposed surface of the rock, or form intricate multicolored mosaics with other lichen communities. Its communities are part of the aesthetic appeal to visitors of Yosemite National Park and Sequoia National Park.

It is found in the Rocky Mountains, including in alpine zones, and in the United States Sierra Nevada range. It tightly adheres to the rock faces giving it the appearance of being painted on.

It is a known host species for the lichenicolous fungus Muellerella pygmaea var. pygmaea.

See also
 Lichens of the Sierra Nevada (U.S.)
 List of Lecidea species

References

 

Lecideales
Lichen species
Lichens described in 1805
Fungi of the United States
Taxa named by Augustin Pyramus de Candolle
Fungi without expected TNC conservation status